Wojna plemników (Polish War of spermatozoons) is fourth studio album of punk rock band Big Cyc, released on 1993.

Track listing
"Wojna plemników" (War of spermatozoons)
"Towar schodzi cały dzień" (I'm selling it all day)
"Od przyjaciół moskali" (From my Moscow friends)
"De mono" (Polish pronunciation for The mono) — a parody cover Polish pop rock hit De Mono "Kochać Inaczej" (To love differently)
"Polska rodzina" (Polish family)
"Bałkański turysta" (Balkan tourist)
"Synagoga dla pieroga" (Synagogue for Pierogi)
"Berlin Zachodni II" (West Berlin II)
"Jazda" (Hellride)
"Ostry dyżur" (Emergency)
"Chuligani i złodzieje" (Hooligans and thieves)
"Kobiety z Sarajewa" (Women from Sarajevo)
"Piosenka o Solidarności czyli Wszystko gnije" (Song about Solidarność,  that is everythings rotting)

Credits
Dżej Dżej – bass guitar, lead vocal
Dżery – drums, vocal
Piękny Roman – lead guitar, vocal
Skiba – vocal, lyrics

1993 albums
Big Cyc albums